Jochen Cassel (born 9 August 1981) is a German retired badminton player affiliated with BC Bischmisheim club.

Cassel was once the best German player in his years, he and Björn Joppien were U-19 German champions in 1998 in the boys' doubles. His notable achievements were title wins in Iceland, Ireland and Mauritius, Israel and Bahrain together with his partner Thomas Tesche. He became the National Champion twice in 2007 and 2008. He completed his studies from University of Saarbrücken in Germany and currently works as a managing director of 'Joyn', a streaming service providing company.

Achievements

IBF/BWF International 
Men's doubles

Mixed doubles

References 

1981 births
Living people
German male badminton players